Charles Poulin (born July 27, 1972) is a former ice hockey player who was awarded the CHL Player of the Year award as a member of the Saint-Hyacinthe Laser of the Quebec Major Junior Hockey League, but never played in the National Hockey League.  He was born in Quebec, Canada. Poulin played for the Fredericton Canadiens of the American Hockey League and Quebec Rafales of the International Hockey League, as well as a number of smaller teams in North America and Europe. He retired from hockey in 2004.

Career statistics

References

External links

1972 births
Canadian ice hockey centres
Living people
Fredericton Canadiens players
Montreal Canadiens draft picks
Saint-Hyacinthe Laser players
Ice hockey people from Quebec
Conservative Party of Canada candidates for the Canadian House of Commons
Quebec candidates for Member of Parliament
Quebec Rafales players
Canadian sportsperson-politicians
Tallahassee Tiger Sharks players
Abilene Aviators players
Shreveport Mudbugs players